In the Line of Fire is a 1993 American political action thriller film directed by Wolfgang Petersen and starring Clint Eastwood, John Malkovich and Rene Russo. Written by Jeff Maguire, the film is about a disillusioned and obsessed former CIA agent who attempts to assassinate the President of the United States and the Secret Service agent who tracks him. Eastwood's character is the sole active-duty Secret Service agent who is still remaining from the detail that had guarded John F. Kennedy in Dallas, Texas, at the time of his assassination in 1963. The film also stars Dylan McDermott, Gary Cole, John Mahoney, and Fred Dalton Thompson.

In the Line of Fire was co-produced by Columbia Pictures and Castle Rock Entertainment, with Columbia handling distribution. The film was a critical and commercial success. It grossed $187 million against a $40 million production budget and earned three nominations at the 66th Academy Awards.

Plot
Frank Horrigan and Al D'Andrea meet with members of a counterfeiting group at a marina. The group's leader, Mendoza, tells Horrigan that he has identified D'Andrea as an undercover United States Secret Service agent, and forces him to prove his loyalty by putting a gun to D'Andrea's head and pulling the trigger. When the gun just clicks, Mendoza is glad to see Frank passed the test, escaping suspicion. Using his own gun, Horrigan then shoots and kills Mendoza's men, identifies himself as Secret Service, and arrests Mendoza.

Horrigan investigates a complaint from a landlady about an apartment's absent tenant, Joseph McCrawley. He finds a collage of photographs and newspaper articles on famous assassinations, a model-building magazine, and a Time cover with the President's head circled. When Horrigan and D'Andrea return with a search warrant, only one photograph remains, which shows a much younger Horrigan standing behind John F. Kennedy in Dallas in 1963, on the day Kennedy was assassinated. Horrigan is the only remaining active agent who was guarding the President that day, and is wracked with guilt over his failure to react quickly enough to the first shot and shield Kennedy from the subsequent fatal bullet, which could have saved the President's life. The guilt drove Horrigan to drink excessively, and his family left him.

Horrigan receives a phone call from McCrawley, who calls himself "Booth". He tells Horrigan that, like John Wilkes Booth and Lee Harvey Oswald, he plans to kill the President of the United States, who is running for reelection and is making many public appearances around the country. Horrigan, despite his age, asks to return to the Presidential Protective Division, where he begins a relationship with fellow agent Lilly Raines.

Booth continues to call Horrigan as part of his "game", even though he knows that his calls are being traced. He mocks Horrigan's failure to protect Kennedy but calls him a "friend". Booth escapes Horrigan and D'Andrea after one such call from Lafayette Park, but inadvertently leaves a palm print on a passing car. The Federal Bureau of Investigation matches the print, but because the person's identity is classified, the agency cannot disclose it to the Secret Service. The FBI does notify the Central Intelligence Agency.

At a campaign event in Chicago, Booth pops a decorative balloon. Horrigan, who is groggy with the flu, mistakes the pop for a gunshot and over-reacts. Because of the error, he is removed from the protective detail by White House Chief of Staff Harry Sargent and head of security detail Bill Watts, but retains the Booth case. Horrigan and D'Andrea follow a lead from the model-building magazine to a Phoenix home belonging to Mitch Leary; upon entering, the two agents subdue an unknown individual, revealed to be a CIA agent working with Leary's associate. The CIA reveals that Leary is a former agency assassin who has suffered a mental breakdown and is now a "predator" seeking revenge on his former masters. Leary, who has already killed several people as he prepares for the assassination, uses his model-making skills to mold a zip gun out of composite material to evade metal detectors.

D'Andrea confides to Horrigan that he is going to retire immediately because of nightmares about the Mendoza incident, but Horrigan dissuades him from doing so. After Leary taunts Horrigan about the President facing danger in California, Horrigan and D' Andrea chase him across Washington rooftops, where Leary shoots and kills D'Andrea but saves Horrigan from falling to his death as he clings to the side of the building. Horrigan asks Raines to reassign him to the protective detail when the President visits Los Angeles, but a television crew films him mistaking a bellboy at the hotel for a security threat, pinning him against the wall, and Watts and Sargent again force Horrigan to leave the detail.

Horrigan connects Leary to a bank employee's murder and determines that Leary, who has made several large campaign contributions, is among the guests at a campaign dinner at the hotel. He sees the President approaching Leary and jumps into the path of the assassin's bullet, saving the President's life. As the Secret Service quickly removes the President, Leary uses Horrigan—who is wearing a bulletproof vest—as a hostage to escape to the hotel's external elevator. Horrigan uses his earpiece to tell Raines and sharpshooters where to aim; although they miss Leary, Horrigan defeats him, leaving him hanging from the edge. Though Horrigan attempts to save him, Leary commits suicide by letting go and falling to his death.

Horrigan, now a hero, retires, as his fame makes it impossible for him to do his job. He and Raines find a farewell message from Leary on Horrigan's answering machine. Horrigan and Raines visit the Lincoln Memorial, the site of the first time they had gotten together off-duty.

Cast

Production

Producer Jeff Apple began developing In the Line of Fire in the mid-1980s. He had planned on making a movie about a Secret Service Agent on detail during the Kennedy assassination since his boyhood. Apple was inspired and intrigued by a vivid early childhood memory of meeting Vice President Lyndon B. Johnson in person, surrounded by Secret Service Agents with earpieces in dark suits and sunglasses. The concept later struck Apple as an adolescent watching televised replays of the assassination of President John F. Kennedy. In 1991, writer Jeff Maguire came aboard and completed the script that would become the movie. In April, 1992, Castle Rock bought the script for $1.4 million.

Eastwood and Petersen offered the role of Leary to Robert De Niro, who turned it down due to scheduling conflicts with A Bronx Tale.

Filming began in late 1992 in Washington, D.C. Scenes in the White House were filmed on an existing set, while an Air Force One interior set had to be built at a cost of $250,000. The film's climactic scenes were shot inside the lobby and elevators of the Los Angeles Bonaventure Hotel, while earlier scenes of Frank and Lilly sharing intimate moments were filmed in the nearby Los Angeles Biltmore Hotel.

A subplot of the film is the President's re-election campaign. For the scenes of campaign rallies, the filmmakers used digitally altered footage from the campaign events of President George H. W. Bush and then-Governor Bill Clinton.

The movie also inserted digitized images from 1960s Clint Eastwood movies into the Kennedy assassination scenes. As Jeff Apple described it to the Los Angeles Times, Clint "gets the world's first digital haircut".

In an interview with Larry King, President Bill Clinton praised the film. Unsure if this endorsement would help or hurt the film, Peterson decided against using his quotes to market the film.

Release
In the Line of Fire was released in United States theaters in July 1993. It was one of the first films to have a trailer for the film made available online. Offered via AOL, the trailer was downloaded 170 times in a week and a half.

Box office
The film earned $15 million in its opening weekend. It earned over $102 million in North America and $85 million in other territories, for a total of $187,343,874 worldwide,  against a budget of approximately $40 million.

Critical response
On Rotten Tomatoes, In the Line of Fire has a "Certified Fresh" 96% rating based on 73 reviews, with an average rating of 7.7/10. The site's consensus states: "A straightforward thriller of the highest order, In the Line of Fire benefits from Wolfgang Petersen's taut direction and charismatic performances from Clint Eastwood and John Malkovich." On Metacritic, it has a score of 74 out of 100 based on reviews from 16 critics, indicating "generally favorable reviews". Audiences polled by CinemaScore gave the film an average grade of "A" on an A+ to F scale.

Vincent Canby of The New York Times wrote: "It's movie making of the high, smooth, commercial order that Hollywood prides itself on but achieves with singular infrequency."
Roger Ebert gave the film three and a half stars out of four, writing: "Most thrillers these days are about stunts and action. In the Line of Fire has a mind."
Kenneth Turan of the Los Angeles Times called the film "crisply entertaining". He praised the casting, "Malkovich’s insinuating, carefully thought out delivery is in the same way an ideal foil for Eastwood’s bluntly straightforward habits", and Eastwood "every part of this film trades so heavily on Eastwood’s presence that it is impossible to imagine it with anyone else in the starring role."

Accolades

66th Academy Awards
 Nominated: Best Supporting Actor (John Malkovich)
 Nominated: Best Original Screenplay (Jeff Maguire)
 Nominated: Best Film Editing (Anne V. Coates)

47th BAFTA Awards
 Nominated: Best Actor in a Supporting Role (John Malkovich)
 Nominated: Best Editing (Anne V. Coates)
 Nominated: Best Original Screenplay (Jeff Maguire)

Other awards
 1994 Chicago Film Critics Association Award Nomination for Best Supporting Actor (John Malkovich)
 1994 Golden Globe Award Nomination for Best Performance by an Actor in a Supporting Role (John Malkovich)
 1994 MTV Movie Award Nomination for Best Villain (John Malkovich)
 AFI's 100 Years...100 Heroes and Villains (2003):
 Mitch Leary – Nominated Villain

Novelization
A novelization of the film was published by Jove Books. Author Max Allan Collins wrote the book in nine days.

References
Citations

Bibliography

External links

 
 
 
 
 

1993 films
1993 action thriller films
1990s American films
1990s English-language films
1990s political thriller films
American action thriller films
American political thriller films
Castle Rock Entertainment films
Columbia Pictures films
Films about assassinations
Films about elections
Films about the Central Intelligence Agency
Films about the United States Secret Service
Films directed by Wolfgang Petersen
Films scored by Ennio Morricone
Films set in Los Angeles
Films set in Washington, D.C.
Films shot in Los Angeles
Films shot in Washington, D.C.
Political action films